This is an alphabetically ordered list of Commelina species. The list includes all species accepted  by the World Checklist of Selected Plant Families.

A

Commelina acutispatha De Wild.
Commelina acutissima Urb.
Commelina africana L.
Commelina agrostophylla F.Muell.
Commelina albescens Hassk.
Commelina albiflora Faden
Commelina amplexicaulis Hassk.
Commelina appendiculata C.B.Clarke
Commelina arenicola Faden
Commelina ascendens J.K.Morton
Commelina aspera G.Don ex Benth.
Commelina attenuata K.D.Koenig ex Vahl
Commelina aurantiiflora Faden & Raynsf.
Commelina auriculata Blume
Commelina avenifolia J.Graham

B

Commelina bambusifolia Matuda
Commelina bambusifolioides Matuda
Commelina bangii Rusby
Commelina barbata Lam.
Commelina beccariana Martelli
Commelina bella Oberm.
Commelina benghalensis L.
Commelina bequaertii De Wild.
Commelina boissieriana C.B.Clarke
Commelina bracteosa Hassk.
Commelina bravoa Matuda

C

Commelina cameroonensis J.K.Morton
Commelina capitata Benth.
Commelina caroliniana Walter
Commelina chamissonis Klotzsch ex C.B.Clarke
Commelina chayaensis Faden
Commelina ciliata Stanley
Commelina clarkeana K.Schum.
Commelina clavata C.B.Clarke
Commelina clavatoides Nampy & S.M.Joseph
Commelina coelestis Willd.
Commelina communis L.
Commelina congesta C.B.Clarke
Commelina congestipatha López-Ferr. & al.
Commelina corbisieri De Wild.
Commelina corradii Chiov. ex Chiarugi
Commelina crassicaulis C.B.Clarke
Commelina cufodontii Chiov.
Commelina cyanea R.Br.

D

Commelina dammeriana K.Schum.
Commelina deflexa Rusby
Commelina dekindtiana Fritsch
Commelina demissa C.B.Clarke
Commelina dianthifolia Delile
Commelina diffusa Burm.f.
Commelina disperma Faden
Commelina droogmansiana De Wild.

E

Commelina eckloniana Kunth
Commelina elliptica Kunth in Humb. & al.
Commelina ensifolia R.Br.
Commelina erecta L.

F

Commelina fasciculata Ruiz & Pav.
Commelina fluviatilis Brenan
Commelina foliacea Chiov.
Commelina forskaolii Vahl
Commelina frutescens Faden

G

Commelina gambiae C.B.Clarke
Commelina gelatinosa Edgew.
Commelina geniculata Desv. ex Ham.
Commelina giorgii De Wild.
Commelina gourmaensis A.Chev.
Commelina grandis Brenan
Commelina grossa C.B.Clarke
Commelina guaranitica C.B.Clarke ex Chodat & Hassl.

H

Commelina haitiensis Urb. & Ekman
Commelina heterosperma Blatt. & Hallb.
Commelina hispida Ruiz & Pav.
Commelina hockii De Wild.
Commelina holubii C.B.Clarke
Commelina homblei De Wild.
Commelina huillensis Welw. ex C.B.Clarke
Commelina humblotii H.Perrier

I
Commelina imberbis Ehrenb. ex Hassk.
Commelina indehiscens E.Barnes
Commelina irumuensis De Wild.

J
Commelina jaliscana Matuda
Commelina jamesonii C.B.Clarke

K

Commelina kapiriensis De Wild.
Commelina kilanga De Wild.
Commelina kisantuensis De Wild.
Commelina kitaleensis Faden
Commelina kituloensis Faden
Commelina kotschyi Hassk.

L

Commelina lanceolata R.Br.
Commelina latifolia Hochst. ex A.Rich.
Commelina leiocarpa Benth.
Commelina longicapsa C.B.Clarke
Commelina longifolia Lam.
Commelina loureiroi Kunth
Commelina lukei Faden
Commelina lukonzolwensis De Wild.
Commelina luteiflora De Wild.
Commelina luzonensis Elmer

M

Commelina macrospatha Gilg & Ledermann ex Mildbr.
Commelina macrosperma J.K.Morton
Commelina maculata Edgew.
Commelina madagascarica C.B.Clarke
Commelina major H.Perrier
Commelina martyrum H.Lév.
Commelina mascarenica C.B.Clarke
Commelina mathewsii (C.B.Clarke) Faden & D.R.Hunt
Commelina melanorrhiza Faden
Commelina membranacea Robyns
Commelina mensensis Schweinf.
Commelina merkeri K.Schum.
Commelina microspatha K.Schum.
Commelina milne-redheadii Faden
Commelina minor Y.N.Lee & Y.C.Oh
Commelina modesta Oberm.
Commelina montigena H.Perrier
Commelina mwatayamvoana P.A.Duvign. & Dewit

N

Commelina neurophylla C.B.Clarke
Commelina nigritana Benth.
Commelina nivea López-Ferr. & al.
Commelina nyasensis C.B.Clarke

O
Commelina obliqua Vahl
Commelina oligotricha Miq.
Commelina orchidophylla Faden & Layton

P

Commelina paleata Hassk. in Miq.
Commelina pallida Willd.
Commelina pallidispatha Faden
Commelina paludosa Blume
Commelina petersii Hassk.
Commelina phaeochaeta Chiov.
Commelina platyphylla Klotzsch ex Seub.
Commelina polhillii Faden & M.H.Alford
Commelina pseudopurpurea Faden
Commelina pseudoscaposa De Wild.
Commelina purpurea C.B.Clarke
Commelina pycnospatha Brenan
Commelina pynaertii De Wild.

Q
Commelina quarrei De Wild.
Commelina queretarensis López-Ferr. & al.
Commelina quitensis Benth.

R

Commelina ramosissima López-Ferr. & al.
Commelina ramulosa (C.B.Clarke) H.Perrier
Commelina reptans Brenan
Commelina reticulata Stanley
Commelina reygaertii De Wild.
Commelina rhodesica Norl.
Commelina robynsii De Wild.
Commelina rogersii Burtt Davy
Commelina rosulata Faden & Layton
Commelina ruandensis De Wild.
Commelina rufipes Seub. in Mart. & al.
Commelina rupicola Font Quer ex Emb. & Maire in Jahand. & al.
Commelina rzedowskii López-Ferr. & al.

S

Commelina saxatilis H.Perrier
Commelina saxosa De Wild.
Commelina scabra Benth.
Commelina scandens Welw. ex C.B.Clarke
Commelina scaposa C.B.Clarke
Commelina schinzii C.B.Clarke in T.Durand & Schinz
Commelina schliebenii Mildbr.
Commelina schomburgkiana Klotzsch in R.H.Schomb.
Commelina schweinfurthii C.B.Clarke
Commelina shinsendaensis De Wild.
Commelina sikkimensis C.B.Clarke
Commelina singularis Vell.
Commelina socorrogonzaleziae Espejo & López-Ferr.
Commelina somalensis Chiov.
Commelina spectabilis C.B.Clarke
Commelina sphaerorrhizoma Faden & Layton
Commelina standleyi Steyerm.
Commelina stefaniniana Chiov.
Commelina subcucullata C.B.Clarke
Commelina subscabrifolia De Wild.
Commelina subulata Roth
Commelina suffruticosa Blume
Commelina sulcatisperma Faden
Commelina sylvatica De Wild.

T

Commelina texcocana Matuda
Commelina trachysperma Chiov.
Commelina transversifolia De Wild.
Commelina triangulispatha Mildbr.
Commelina tricarinata Stanley
Commelina tricolor E.Barnes
Commelina trilobosperma K.Schum.
Commelina tuberosa L.

U
Commelina umbellata Schumach. & Thonn.
Commelina undulata R.Br.
Commelina ussilensis Schweinf.

V

Commelina velutina Mildbr.
Commelina vermoesenii De Wild.
Commelina vilavelhensis Corrêa da Maia, Cervi & Tardivo
Commelina villosa C.B.Clarke
Commelina virginica L.

W
Commelina welwitschii C.B.Clarke
Commelina wightii Raizada

Z

Commelina zambesica C.B.Clarke
Commelina zenkeri C.B.Clarke
Commelina zeylanica Falkenb.
Commelina zigzag P.A.Duvign. & Dewit

References 

Commelina